The 1993–94 SK Rapid Wien season is the 96th season in club history.

Squad statistics

Fixtures and results

Bundesliga

League table

Cup

References

1993-94 Rapid Wien Season
Austrian football clubs 1993–94 season